The Girl and the Dreamcatcher was an American pop duo from Los Angeles that consisted of Liv and Maddie co-stars/former couple  Dove Cameron ("the Girl") and Ryan McCartan ("the Dreamcatcher"). Their debut EP, Negatives, was released on July 29, 2016.

History

2014–2015: Formation and first singles 
Cameron and McCartan created a YouTube channel in July 2014, posting covers of some popular songs. Their first video, a cover of "At Last I See the Light", was released the following day. In May 2015, Cameron announced that the two are officially forming a band and would release their first original song soon.

In September 2015, they announced their band name, "The Girl and the Dreamcatcher", and that their first single, "Written in the Stars", would be released on October 2, 2015. On December 2, 2015, the band released a cover of the song "All I Want for Christmas Is You" by Mariah Carey, followed by a cover of Frank Sinatra's version of "Have Yourself a Merry Little Christmas" six days later, on December 8, 2015.

2016: Negatives 
In January 2016, Cameron and McCartan announced that their next single, titled "Glowing in the Dark", would be released on January 29, 2016. On April 8, 2016, the band officially released their song "Someone You Like", the acoustic version of which was first released on their YouTube channel in 2014. On June 16, 2016, the music video for their next single, "Make You Stay", was exclusively released on People, followed by the song's official release the next day.

In May 2016, the band announced that they would be releasing their first EP, titled Negatives, whose release date was later revealed to be July 29, 2016. It was made available for pre-order on iTunes on July 9, 2016. New songs were released daily leading up to the EP's official release – "My Way" on July 25, "Monster" on July 26, "Cry Wolf" on July 27, and "Gladiator" on July 28. The EP also includes two of their previous singles, "Glowing in the Dark" and "Make You Stay".

In October 2016, McCartan announced the breakup his and Cameron's relationship, stating, "Dove has decided this relationship isn't what she wants. We still love each other very much. Please be sensitive, as this is painful."

Discography

Extended play

Singles

Promotional singles

Music videos

References

External links 
 
 

American pop music groups
Musical groups established in 2014
Musical groups disestablished in 2016
Musical groups from Los Angeles
2014 establishments in California
Male–female musical duos